Barn Owl Review is an American literary magazine based in Akron, Ohio. Barn Owl Review publishes poetry and poetry book reviews annually, debuting each issue in the spring at the AWP conference book fair.

History
Mary Biddinger and Jay Robinson founded Barn Owl Review in 2007 and still serve as co-editors-in-chief. The eighth issue was released in April 2015 in Minneapolis.

Awards and honors 
 Arts Access Grant from the Ohio Arts Council, 2009
 Verse Daily, 2010 "The Claw" by Angela Vogel, "Between Seasons" by Rob Schlegel, "Worse Than the Bite" by Rebecca Givens Rolland, and "Too Darn Hot" by Sarah Perrier.
 Verse Daily, 2009 "How it Started" by Leslie Harrison, "Return as Black Currant" by Anna Journey, and "Clouds" by Jason Bredle.
 Verse Daily, 2008 "Proposal" by Sandra Beasley, "Scientific Method" by Adam Clay,  "Driving Out to Innisfree" by Matthew Thorburn, and "Street Fight" by Wayne Miller.

References

External links
 

Poetry magazines published in the United States
Annual magazines published in the United States
Independent magazines
English-language magazines
Magazines established in 2007
Magazines published in Ohio
2007 establishments in Ohio